Mingghan was a social-military unit of 1,000 households created by Genghis Khan. From this group could be recruited a Mongol regiment of 1,000 men. It is part of the ancient method of organization developed by the nomads of Central Asia based on the decimal system. Tumen, which included 10,000 households and soldiers, was the largest group and it was divided into ten mingghan. A mingghan was made up of 10 jaghuns or 100 arbans. An account cited that once he becomes a guard, it is the duty of a mingghan commander's son to bring a younger brother and 10 other men to serve with him.

See also
 Mongol Empire
 Mongol military tactics and organization
 Tumen

References

Genghis Khan
Military history of the Mongol Empire
Military units and formations by size
Military history of China